Nastassia Maslava (born 16 October 1997) is a Belarusian hammer thrower. She competed in the 2020 Summer Olympics.

References

1997 births
Living people
Sportspeople from Grodno
Athletes (track and field) at the 2020 Summer Olympics
Belarusian female hammer throwers
Olympic athletes of Belarus
People from Drahichyn District